Darryal Edgar Wilson (born September 19, 1960) is a former American football wide receiver in the National Football League (NFL) for the New England Patriots. He played college football at the University of Tennessee.

Early years
Wilson attended Virginia High School, where he practiced football and track. He accepted a football scholarship from the University of Tennessee. As a junior, he appeared in 11 games, registering 5 receptions for 89 yards (17.8-yard avg.) and no touchdowns.

As a senior, he appeared in 11 games, ranking third on the team with 23 receptions for 308 yards (13.4-yard avg.) and one touchdown. He played in an era when Tennessee garnered a reputation as "Wide Receiver U", being part of teams that had wide receivers Willie Gault, Anthony Hancock, Lenny Taylor, Mike Miller, Clyde Duncan, and Tim McGee.

He also was a sprinter in track.

Professional career
Wilson was selected by the New England Patriots in the second round (47th overall) of the 1983 NFL Draft. As a rookie, he appeared in 9 games as a backup, before being lost for the year with a right knee injury he suffered in the ninth game against the Atlanta Falcons. He was placed on the injured reserve list on November 4.

In training camp in 1984, he re-injured his knee and was lost for the year. He was placed on the physically-unable-to-perform list on August 14. In 1985, he was again placed on the physically-unable-to-perform list on August 15. He was waived on February 7, 1986.

References

External links
Darryal Wilson Stats

1960 births
Living people
Sportspeople from Florence, Alabama
Players of American football from Virginia
American football wide receivers
Tennessee Volunteers football players
Tennessee Volunteers men's track and field athletes
New England Patriots players